Aubach may refer to various rivers in Germany:

Aubach (Aar), Hesse, tributary of the Aar
Aubach (at Schwerin), Mecklenburg-Vorpommern, tributary of the pond Pfaffenteich
Aubach (Dill), Hesse, tributary of the Dill
Aubach (Elsava), Bavaria, tributary of the Elsava
Aubach (Lohr), Bavaria, tributary of the Lohr
Aubach (Schwabach), Bavaria, tributary of the Schwabach
Aubach (Wied), Rhineland-Palatinate, tributary of the Wied
Aubach (Wiehl), North Rhine-Westphalia, tributary of the Wiehl